The 1946 Fisk Bulldogs football team was an American football team that represented Fisk University as a member of the Southern Intercollegiate Athletic Conference (SIAC) during the 1946 college football season. In their first season under head coach Julian Bell, the Bulldogs compiled a 3–4–1 record (0–3 against SIAC opponents) and outcored all opponents by a total of 61 to 55.

In December 1946, The Pittsburgh Courier applied the Dickinson System to the black college teams and rated Fisk at No. 15.

The team played its home games at the Sulphur Dell in Nashville, Tennessee.

Schedule

References

Tuskegee
Fisk Bulldogs football seasons
Fisk Bulldogs football